Supermercados Super Selectos is a Salvadoran supermarket chain that is owned by Grupo Calleja and founded by Daniel Calleja (whose grandson, Carlos, is the current Vice-President of Grupo Calleja). The company includes Supermercados De Todo and Selectos Market. Supermercados Super Selectos operates 80 stores in 14 Salvadoran departments.

The company is not related to Puerto Rico's Supermercados Selectos.

History
In 1940, Daniel Calleja founded Super Selectos, which was the first supermarket in El Salvador.

References

External links
Official website 

Salvadoran brands
Supermarkets of North America
Food and drink companies of El Salvador
1940 establishments in El Salvador